José Kléberson Pereira (born 19 June 1979), commonly known as José Kléberson or simply Kléberson, is a Brazilian football coach and former player who is currently the assistant coach of New York City FC. He previously played for Brazil 32 times and was part of the squad that won the 2002 FIFA World Cup.

Playing career

Club

Atlético Paranaense
Kléberson was born and raised in the provincial town of Uraí in the southern Brazilian state of Paraná. He began his football career with Atlético Paranaense. There, Kléberson won the Paraná State League in 2000 and 2001, and the Brazilian Série A title in 2001. His performances for Atlético Paranaense led to Luiz Felipe Scolari calling him up to the Brazil national team for the 2002 FIFA World Cup in South Korea and Japan.

Manchester United
His World Cup performances led to Scolari declaring Kléberson the driving force behind Brazil's cup-winning side, and drew interest from several European teams; Barcelona, Newcastle United, Leeds United and Celtic all expressed an interest. Leeds, failed to secure the signing after Kléberson decided against leaving Brazil without his girlfriend, who he was unable to marry until her 16th birthday, and eventually it was Manchester United who signed Kléberson, paying a fee of £6.5 million on 12 August 2003. Seen as a replacement for Juan Sebastián Verón, Kléberson was injured in his second appearance for the club and made only 20 appearances in two seasons. He scored two league goals in his time at Manchester United, both coming in home wins against Blackburn Rovers and Everton.

Beşiktaş

On 6 August 2005, Kléberson signed for Turkish club Beşiktaş for €2.95 million. He signed a three-year deal, with the option of a further 12 months.

Kléberson unilaterally terminated the contract after claiming the club failed to pay his wages on time.

Flamengo
Kléberson signed with Flamengo on 27 September 2007 as a free agent, but he was unable to play for the club until February 2008, due to problems related to his resignation from Beşiktaş. On 10 August 2007 (announced on 27 August), the FIFA Dispute Resolution Chamber passed a decision that Kléberson had to pay Beşiktaş €3.18 million as for the compensation of breach of contract. and Besiktas had to pay US$461,112 as outstanding wage. Furthermore, Kléberson was suspended for four months (retroactively from 27 September 2007) Kléberson and the club later agreed to reduce the compensation from €3.18 million to €1 million.

Kléberson's first matches for his new club were on the reserves team in several matches of the Rio State League. His climb to the first team started slowly as he began to play consistently in the Copa Libertadores. Kléberson earned an important spot in the midfield after the transfers of Renato Augusto and Marcinho.

After returning to the first team, Kléberson's good spell in 2009 was interrupted on 12 August, in a friendly match against Estonia, where he suffered a foul and fell, causing him a dislocated shoulder. Kléberson had surgery and was expected to miss the rest of the year. He managed to recover quickly being able to return on 22 November in a 0–0 draw against Goiás and also playing in the 2–1 win over Grêmio and winning the 2009 Brazilian Série A, the second in his career.

In the 2010 pre-season, Palmeiras speculated the possibility of involving Kléberson in a trade for Vágner Love, but Flamengo refused to accept the idea.

Bahia
After a poor year playing on loan for Atlético Paranaense, when the club was relegated to Série B, Kléberson signed for Bahia on a two-year contract in July 2012. He scored his first goal for Bahia on his debut, against his former club Flamengo.

Later career in the U.S.
Kléberson was acquired on loan by the Philadelphia Union of Major League Soccer (MLS) on 25 March 2013. He scored the game-winning goal in the 95th minute from a free kick against Toronto FC on 10 October 2013.

On 25 March 2014, Kléberson reportedly signed a two-year deal with Indy Eleven of the North American Soccer League (NASL). Kléberson was released by Indy Eleven in December 2015 after two seasons at the club.

Kléberson signed with NASL side Fort Lauderdale Strikers on 4 January 2016.

International
Kléberson made his first international appearance for Brazil in a friendly match against Bolivia on 31 January 2002. He also marked his debut by scoring Brazil's fourth goal in a 6–0 win. He also scored against Iceland in March 2002. He was subsequently selected by Luiz Felipe Scolari for Brazil's squad for the 2002 FIFA World Cup. He was initially relegated to the bench for the first four matches in the tournament. He was brought into the starting line-up for Brazil's game against England, with Scolari feeling his tenacity would help counter the high work-rate of the English side. His tackle on his future teammate Paul Scholes led to Brazil's equaliser before Brazil ended up winning 2–1. He then was included in the starting lineup for the rest of the tournament. Brazil defeated Germany in the final, with Kléberson setting up one of the two Brazilian goals, as Brazil won the World Cup for a record fifth time.

After the World Cup, Kléberson retained his starting position in Brazil's team under the new coach Carlos Alberto Parreira and was also included in Brazil's squad for 2003 FIFA Confederations Cup, where Brazil were eliminated in the group stage. That summer, Kléberson moved to Europe to join Manchester United. He failed to achieve regular playing time with his club, and as a result he lost his position in the national team. He managed to be included in Brazil's squad for the 2004 Copa América. He made five appearances in the tournament, starting in every match he played as Brazil went on to win the tournament.

After more than four years in the international wilderness, Kléberson was recalled to the national team by Dunga on 28 May 2009. He was recalled to replace Anderson in two matches for 2010 World Cup qualification and the 2009 FIFA Confederations Cup in South Africa. After recovering from his shoulder surgery, once again Kléberson was called up for the national team on 9 February 2010 for a friendly match against the Republic of Ireland on 2 March in London.

Kléberson was then called up to Brazil's 2010 World Cup squad by Dunga on 11 May. The 23-man squad was almost exactly the same as the squad against Ireland but included one additional player, Heurelho Gomes. His only appearance in the 2010 World Cup was in the round of 16 game against Chile.

Management career
In 2017, Kléberson rejoined the Philadelphia Union as a coach in the youth academy. In 2022, he was promoted to assistant coach of Philadelphia Union II for their inaugural season in MLS Next Pro.

Personal life
After Kleberson's starring role at the 2002 World Cup, Europe's top sides competed to sign him, but he chose to stay in Brazil for another year so he could marry his 15-year-old fiancée when she reached the age of consent, having met her when she was 14.

Career statistics

Club

International
Appearances by national team and year

Scores and results list Brazil's goal tally first, score column indicates score after each Kléberson goal.

Honours
Atlético Paranaense
Brazilian Série A: 2001
Paraná State League: 2000, 2001

Manchester United
FA Cup: 2003–04

Beşiktaş
Turkish Cup: 2005–06
Turkish Super Cup: 2006

Flamengo
Brazilian Série A: 2009

Brazil
FIFA World Cup: 2002
FIFA Confederations Cup: 2009
Copa América: 2004

Individual
Bola de Prata: 2001

References

External links

José Kléberson at ManUtd.com

1979 births
Living people
Sportspeople from Paraná (state)
Brazilian footballers
Brazilian expatriate footballers
Brazilian expatriate sportspeople in the United States
Club Athletico Paranaense players
Manchester United F.C. players
Beşiktaş J.K. footballers
CR Flamengo footballers
Esporte Clube Bahia players
Philadelphia Union players
Indy Eleven players
Fort Lauderdale Strikers players
2002 FIFA World Cup players
2003 FIFA Confederations Cup players
2004 Copa América players
2009 FIFA Confederations Cup players
2010 FIFA World Cup players
FIFA World Cup-winning players
Copa América-winning players
FIFA Confederations Cup-winning players
Brazil international footballers
Campeonato Brasileiro Série A players
Premier League players
Süper Lig players
Major League Soccer players
Designated Players (MLS)
North American Soccer League players
Expatriate footballers in England
Brazilian expatriate sportspeople in Turkey
Expatriate footballers in Turkey
Expatriate soccer players in the United States
Association football midfielders
New York City FC non-playing staff